The R612 road is a regional road in Ireland which runs from Carrigaline to Crosshaven, all in County Cork. The road is lasso shaped; two kilometers from its origin on Carrigaline it forks; both forks circle back to this point. 

See also
Roads in Ireland
National primary road
National secondary road

References
Roads Act 1993 (Classification of Regional Roads) Order 2006 – Department of Transport

Regional roads in the Republic of Ireland
Roads in County Cork